Tebenna submicalis is a moth of the family Choreutidae. It is known from China (Shaanxi, Gansu, Hubei), Nepal, Russia and Japan (Hokkaido).

The wingspan is 9–11 mm.

The larvae feed on Anaphalis margaritacea.

References

External links
Japanese Moths

Tebenna
Moths of Japan
Moths described in 1969